Jordi Colomer (born in Barcelona, 1962) is a Spanish artist. He lives and works in Paris and Barcelona. Colomer has worked in the media of sculpture, video, and installation art.

Biography
Colomer studied at the School Eina of Art and Design, History of Art and Architecture in Barcelona. He has worked as a set designer for theater works by Valère Novarina, Joan Brossa, Samuel Beckett, and Robert Ashley. In his first period, he developed sculptures of an architectural scale, walkable buildings, and references to the theater and its devices. In 1996 he began working with videos, in the form of micro-narratives where the characters are confronted with objects, sets, and props. Examples include Simo (1997) and Le Dortoir (2001).

The video series Anarchitekton (2002–2004), is one of his most emblematic; in the four cities of Barcelona, Bucharest, Brasilia, and Osaka, the character called  Idroj Sanicne carries cardboard models and replicas of real buildings. Through changes of scale he describes a sarcastic and critical drift. Other important works are Arabian Stars (2005), filmed in Yemen, A Crime (2005), No Future (2006), and En la Pampa (2008), a five-screen installation filmed at the Atacama desert in northern Chile.

In 2008 the Galerie Nationale du Jeu de Paume in Paris hosted a major retrospective exhibition of his work. He is represented in numerous museums and collections: Museo Reina Sofia, Madrid, Centre Georges Pompidou, Paris, MUMOK, Vienna, MACBA, Barcelona. His work is represented by Galerie Michel Rein (Paris), Galería Juana de Aizpuru (Madrid), and Meessen De Clercq, (Brussels). Colomer represented Spain at 57th Venice Biennale, 2017. **

References

 José-Luis Barrios, Marie-Ange Brayer, Mario Flecha, Marta Gili, Bernard Marcadé, Marti Peran, François Piron, Christine Van Assche et al. Fuegogratis: Jordi Colomer, le point du jour editeur-jeu de paume, Paris, 2008.

External links
Website
 Adrian Searle, The Guardian, about Venice Biennale 2017 

1962 births
Living people
Artists from Catalonia
Spanish video artists
People from Barcelona
Spanish contemporary artists